William Tecumseh Sherman (1820–1891) was a general in the Union Army during the American Civil War.

William Sherman may also refer to:
William Henry Sherman (1865–1928), American publisher
William Sherman (American football) (born 1999), American football offensive tackle
William Watts Sherman (1842–1912), New York City businessman
Will Sherman (1927–1997), American football defensive back
William Tecumseh Sherman (Saint-Gaudens), a 1902 sculpture of the general

See also
William Sherman Jennings (1863–1920), U.S. politician
William Sherman Jennings House
William Sherman Jewell